Persian Lake is a small lake in northern Manitoba, near the border between northeastern Saskatchewan and northwestern Manitoba. The lake is among extremely large number of lakes in Canada. It is part of the Nelson River watershed, and is located around 8 kilometres towards the northeast of the small town of Bakers Narrows.

References 

Lakes of Manitoba